James Harmon Brown and Barbara Esensten are American television writers, primarily working on soap operas. The duo worked together for over 20 years, starting on the prime-time serial Dynasty. Together, they created the soap opera The City, a spinoff of Loving. On November 14, 2012, Esensten died at the age of 75.

Controversy
Brown and Esensten tended to drift towards supernatural and science fiction elements in the shows they were hired for. When the two wrote for Guiding Light during the later part of the 1990s, the show's primary heroine, Reva Shayne, was cloned, and when the duo would later write for Port Charles, vampires were introduced, along with other supernatural creatures.

Because of the 2007-2008 Writers Guild of America strike, Brown and Esensten went financial core within the guild, allowing them to write for All My Children because of financial strains brought on by the strike. Megan McTavish, the writer they replaced at All My Children, was displeased. "These are not youngsters struggling to make mortgage payments or feed their children. Their sole intent now seems to be piling up more money for themselves," she said.

Barbara Esensten
Barbara Esensten (née Sills) was born in Los Angeles, California to Rose Fischer and Max Edward Sills. She had an older sister, Phyllis, and a younger brother, Stanley. The family lived in a middle-class neighborhood (now part of Watts, California). Barbara and Stanley attended Woodcrest elementary school, Bret Hart Junior High School, and Washington High School, all of which are in Southern Los Angeles. Barbara graduated with a bachelor's degree in Political Science from UCLA. Most of her adult life, Barbara and her husband Jack, lived in the affluent Palos Verdes, south of Los Angeles. Barbara was an accomplished pianist, an avid reader, and very much loved her family.

Positions held 
Dynasty
Co-Writers: 1987-1988
Executive Story Editors: 1988-1989

All My Children
Co-Head Writers: July 26, 2007 - January 14, 2008; January 30 - August 26, 2008
Script Writers: July 20, 2010 – September 23, 2011

Days of Our Lives
Script Editors: November 2006 - May 2007

One Life to Live
Script Editors: October 2004 - October 2005

Port Charles 
Co-Head Writers: November 2000 - July 2003 

Guiding Light
Co-Head Writers: 1997 - 2000

Loving
Co-Head Writers: 1994 - November 1995

The City
Creators
Co-Head Writers: November 1995 - March 1997

The Young and the Restless
Script Writer: September 19, 2019 – present (Harmon Brown)

Awards and nominations
Daytime Emmy Awards

WINS
(1993; Best Writing; Guiding Light)
(2012; Best Writing; Days of Our Lives)

NOMINATIONS 
(1999; Best Writing; Guiding Light)
(2006, 2009 & 2012; Best Writing; One Life to Live)

Writers Guild of America Award

NOMINATIONS 
(1995, 1996, 1998 & 1999 seasons; Guiding Light)
(2006 season; One Life to Live)
(2008 season; All My Children)

References

External links 
 
 Obituary

Living people
American soap opera writers
Screenwriting duos
Daytime Emmy Award winners
Place of birth missing (living people)
Year of birth missing (living people)